Sphegina is a genus of small, slender hoverflies. They are widespread throughout Eurasia and North America. In flight they seem to have long hind legs which they often carry hanging down, making them resemble sphecid or ichneumonid wasps. Adult Sphegina are usually found in damp and shady habitats close to water in forested areas, and several species can often be found together. They often feed on white and yellow flowers of Apiaceae, Ranunculaceae, Asteraceae, and Rosaceae like Crataegus, Sorbus, and Sorbaria. Larvae nest in the sap of living and dead trees or in decaying cambium under tree bark lying in water or other damp conditions. The larvae of some species have been discovered in the tunnels of other xylophagous insects.

Sphegina generally have a face strongly concave and bare in both sexes, antennal basoflagellomere oval with a long dorsal and pilose arista; eyes bare and dichoptic in both sexes; postpronotum pilose; metasternum and katepisternum non-pilose; ventral scutellar fringe absent; alula narrow or absent; postmetacoxal bridge complete and broad; metaleg much longer than pro- and mesoleg and with incrassate femur; abdomen petiolate. Sphegina are similar to the species of their sister group Neoascia but are distinguished by the following characters: face oblique, nearly straight, laterally pilose; katepisternum usually pilose; basoflagellomere usually elongate, longer than wide; arista bare and about as long as basoflagellomere. The small-sized species of Sphegina can be very similar to Neoascia in habitus and they may be especially difficult to distinguish in the wild.

Sphegina has two subgenera Asiosphegina and Sphegina.

Species

Subgenus: Sphegina Meigen, 1822 
Sphegina abbreviata Steenis, Hippa & Mutin, 2018
Sphegina alaoglui Hayat, 1997
Sphegina albipes (Bigot, 1883)
Sphegina amurensis Mutin, 1984
Sphegina anatolii Mutin, 1999
Sphegina angustata Steenis, Hippa & Mutin, 2018
Sphegina appalachiensis Coovert, 1977
Sphegina armatipes Malloch, 1922
Sphegina aterrima Stackelberg, 1953
Sphegina atrolutea Lucas in Thompson & Torp, 1986
Sphegina biannulata Malloch, 1922
Sphegina brachygaster Hull, 1935
Sphegina brevisterna Violovich, 1980
Sphegina bridwelli Cole, 1924
Sphegina californica Malloch, 1922
Sphegina calthae Mutin, 1984
Sphegina campanulata Robertson, 1901
Sphegina carbonaria Mutin, 1998
Sphegina catthae Mutin, 1984
Sphegina clavata (Scopoli, 1763)
Sphegina claviventris Stackelberg, 1956
Sphegina clunipes (Fallén, 1816)
Sphegina cornifera Becker, 1921
Sphegina dogieli Stackelberg, 1953
Sphegina elegans Schummel, 1843
Sphegina elongata Shiraki & Edashige, 1953
Sphegina fasciata Shiraki, 1968
Sphegina flavimana Malloch, 1922
Sphegina flavomaculata Malloch, 1922
Sphegina grunini Stackelberg, 1953
Sphegina guptai Mutin, 1998
Sphegina hansoni Thompson, 1966
Sphegina hennigiana Stackelberg, 1956
Sphegina hodosa Violovich, 1981
Sphegina infuscata Loew, 1863
Sphegina japonica Shiraki & Edashige, 1953
Sphegina javana Meijere, 1914
Sphegina keeniana Williston, 1887
Sphegina kumaoniensis Mutin, 1998
Sphegina kurenzovi Mutin, 1984
Sphegina latifrons Egger, 1865
Sphegina limbipennis Strobl, 1909
Sphegina lobata Loew, 1863
Sphegina lobulifera Malloch, 1922
Sphegina melancholica Stackelberg, 1956
Sphegina micangensis Huo, Ren & Zheng, 2007
Sphegina mikado Mutin, 2001
Sphegina montana Becker, 1921
Sphegina negrobovi Skufjin, 1976
Sphegina nigrapicula Huo, Ren & Zheng, 2007
Sphegina nigerrima Shiraki, 1930
Sphegina nigra Meigen, 1822
Sphegina nigrimanus Cole, 1924
Sphegina obscurifacies Stackelberg, 1956
Sphegina occidentalis Malloch, 1922
Sphegina petiolata Coquillett, 1910
Sphegina platychira Szilády, 1937
Sphegina pontica Mutin, 1998
Sphegina potanini Stackelberg, 1953
Sphegina punctata Cole, 1921
Sphegina quadrisetae Huo & Ren, 2006
Sphegina rufa Malloch, 1922
Sphegina rufiventris Loew, 1863
Sphegina smirnovi Violovich in Stackelberg, 1953
Sphegina spheginea (Zetterstedt, 1838)
Sphegina spiniventris Stackelberg, 1953
Sphegina stackelbergi Violovich, 1980
Sphegina sublatifrons Vujic, 1990
Sphegina taibaishanensis Huo & Ren, 2006
Sphegina tenuifemorata Mutin, 1984
Sphegina thoraciaca Shiraki, 1968
Sphegina tricoloripes Brunetti, 1915
Sphegina tristriata Brunetti, 1913
Sphegina tuvinica Violovich, 1980
Sphegina uncinata Hippa, Steenis & Mutin, 2015
Sphegina univittata Huo, Ren & Zheng, 2007
Sphegina varidissima Shiraki, 1930
Sphegina varifacies Kassebeer, 1991
Sphegina verae Mutin, 1984
Sphegina verecunda Collin, 1937
Sphegina violovitshi Stackelberg, 1956
Subgenus: Asiosphegina Stackelberg, 1974
Sphegina achaeta Hippa, Steenis & Mutin, 2015
Sphegina adusta Hippa, Steenis & Mutin, 2015
Sphegina amplistylus Steenis, Hippa & Mutin, 2018
Sphegina atricolor Hippa, Steenis & Mutin, 2015
Sphegina atrimanus Steenis, Hippa & Mutin, 2018
Sphegina bidens Hippa, Steenis & Mutin, 2015
Sphegina bifida Steenis, Hippa & Mutin, 2018
Sphegina bilobata Hippa, Steenis & Mutin, 2015
Sphegina bracon Steenis, Hippa & Mutin, 2018
Sphegina brevipilus Steenis, Hippa & Mutin, 2018
Sphegina carinata Hippa, Steenis & Mutin, 2015
Sphegina cerina Hippa, Steenis & Mutin, 2015
Sphegina clavigera Steenis, Hippa & Mutin, 2018
Sphegina collicola Steenis, Hippa & Mutin, 2018
Sphegina crassispina Hippa, Steenis & Mutin, 2015
Sphegina crinita Steenis, Hippa & Mutin, 2018
Sphegina crucivena Hippa, Steenis & Mutin, 2015
Sphegina culex Hippa, Steenis & Mutin, 2015
Sphegina cultrigera Hippa, Steenis & Mutin, 2015
Sphegina dentata Steenis, Hippa & Mutin, 2018
Sphegina distincta Steenis, Hippa & Mutin, 2018
Sphegina ensifera Hippa, Steenis & Mutin, 2015
Sphegina exilipes Steenis, Hippa & Mutin, 2018
Sphegina falcata Hippa, Steenis & Mutin, 2015
Sphegina farinosa Steenis, Hippa & Mutin, 2018
Sphegina fimbriata Steenis, Hippa & Mutin, 2018
Sphegina forceps Hippa, Steenis & Mutin, 2015
Sphegina forficata Hippa, Steenis & Mutin, 2015
Sphegina freyana Stackelberg, 1956
Sphegina furcillata Steenis, Hippa & Mutin, 2018
Sphegina furva Hippa, Steenis & Mutin, 2015
Sphegina ghatsi Steenis, Hippa & Mutin, 2018
Sphegina gigantea Steenis, Hippa & Mutin, 2018
Sphegina gigas Hippa, Steenis & Mutin, 2015
Sphegina granditarsis Steenis, Hippa & Mutin, 2018
Sphegina hamulata Steenis, Hippa & Mutin, 2018
Sphegina hauseri Steenis, Hippa & Mutin, 2018
Sphegina incretonigra Steenis, Hippa & Mutin, 2018
Sphegina index Hippa, Steenis & Mutin, 2015
Sphegina inflata Steenis, Hippa & Mutin, 2018
Sphegina inventum Steenis, Hippa & Mutin, 2018
Sphegina karnataka Steenis, Hippa & Mutin, 2018
Sphegina licina Steenis, Hippa & Mutin, 2018
Sphegina lobulata Steenis, Hippa & Mutin, 2018
Sphegina lucida Steenis, Hippa & Mutin, 2018
Sphegina malaisei Hippa, Steenis & Mutin, 2015
Sphegina minuta Hippa, Steenis & Mutin, 2015
Sphegina mirifica Hippa, Steenis & Mutin, 2015
Sphegina nasuta Hippa, Steenis & Mutin, 2015
Sphegina nigrotarsata Steenis, Hippa & Mutin, 2018
Sphegina nitidifrons Stackelberg, 1956
Sphegina nubicola Steenis, Hippa & Mutin, 2018
Sphegina orientalis Kertész, 1914
Sphegina ornata Steenis, Hippa & Mutin, 2018
Sphegina parvula Hippa, Steenis & Mutin, 2015
Sphegina perlobata Steenis, Hippa & Mutin, 2018
Sphegina philippina Thompson, 1999
Sphegina plautus Steenis, Hippa & Mutin, 2018
Sphegina pollex Hippa, Steenis & Mutin, 2015
Sphegina pollinosa Hippa, Steenis & Mutin, 2015
Sphegina prolixa Steenis, Hippa & Mutin, 2018
Sphegina pusilla Hippa, Steenis & Mutin, 2015
Sphegina radula Hippa, Steenis & Mutin, 2015
Sphegina raduloides Hippa, Steenis & Mutin, 2015
Sphegina setosa Steenis, Hippa & Mutin, 2018
Sphegina sibirica Stackelberg, 1953
Sphegina siculifera Hippa, Steenis & Mutin, 2015
Sphegina simplex Hippa, Steenis & Mutin, 2015
Sphegina sinesmila Hippa, Steenis & Mutin, 2015
Sphegina spathigera Steenis, Hippa & Mutin, 2018
Sphegina spenceri Steenis, Hippa & Mutin, 2018
Sphegina strigillata Steenis, Hippa & Mutin, 2018
Sphegina subradula Hippa, Steenis & Mutin, 2015
Sphegina taiwanensis Steenis, Hippa & Mutin, 2018
Sphegina trichaeta Hippa, Steenis & Mutin, 2015
Sphegina trispina Hippa, Steenis & Mutin, 2015
Sphegina umbrosa Steenis, Hippa & Mutin, 2018
Sphegina uncinata Hippa, Steenis & Mutin, 2015
Sphegina verrucosa Steenis, Hippa & Mutin, 2018
Sphegina vietnamensis Steenis, Hippa & Mutin, 2018

References 

Diptera of Europe
Diptera of North America
Diptera of Asia
Hoverfly genera
Eristalinae
Taxa named by Johann Wilhelm Meigen